Kanaa is a 2018 Indian Tamil-language sports drama film starring Sathyaraj, Aishwarya Rajesh, Sivakarthikeyan, and Darshan. The film is written and directed by Arunraja Kamaraj, who is directing for the first time. It was released theatrically on 21 December 2018. The film has music composed by Dhibu Ninan Thomas, cinematography by Dinesh B. Krishnan, edited by Ruben and produced by Sivakarthikeyan in his newly established Sivakarthikeyan Productions banner. It was remade in Telugu as Kousalya Krishnamurthy, with Aishwarya and Sivakarthikeyan reprising their roles.

Plot 
Kousalya Murugesan aka Kowsi is the daughter of Murugesan, a farmer in Kulithalai, Karur. She aspires to become an international cricketer so she can put a smile on her cricket-loving father's face by helping the country win. The reason for this being portrayed in the initial scenes where Murugesan is very eager to see India's matches in the 2007 Cricket World Cup. However, he gets heartbroken on seeing India's crashing defeat to Sri Lanka in the group stages, which sees India getting subsequently knocked out. Murugesan controls his feelings before his daughter, but she witnesses him crying and being heartbroken throughout the whole night. Hence, this aspires a 11-year old Kowsi, to take up cricket seriously, represent her country, and win the world cup one day for her father's sake.

Kowsi joins the local cricket team in the village when she is 14, who were mostly her school seniors. Kowsi's off-spin bowling technique gets her wickets, and everyone starts appreciating her talent. At the same time, she also earns the wrath of many villagers as she plays cricket with boys wearing t-shirts and trousers, which is portrayed to be non-traditional. However, Murugesan does not care for this and he supports his daughter. Kowsi decides to appear for the Tamil Nadu team selection test, but she gets rejected in her first attempt. She does not give up and tries again where she succeeds and starts playing in Tamil Nadu women's team. Her hard work pays off, and she is selected in Indian women's cricket team. Kowsi goes to Bangalore to get trained in a national cricket academy.

Meanwhile, Murugesan faces a tough time with agriculture, as he is unable to repay the debt of Rs. 4 lakhs from a bank, resulting in a rift created between Murugesan and the bank manager. Kowsi faces a hard time in cricket academy due to internal politics with senior players ill-treating her as she cannot speak Hindi. The team's coach also hates Kowsi and demotivates her to a large extent. However, the coach retires, and there comes a new coach named Nelson Dilipkumar. Nelson, who was an ex-Indian cricketer, had to retire after his very first International Match as he sustained a terrible eye injury, leaving him partially blinded in the left eye. Nelson develops the team's spirit and gets the players ready for the upcoming T20 world cup. Nelson spots Kowsi's spin bowling capabilities and trains her in the right path. Nelson also locks horns with the team selection committee and ensures that Kowsi is present in the world cup squad. However, Nelson decides to rest Kowsi for the league matches, which makes her feel sad. However, Nelson reveals his strategy, that the intention was to hide Kowsi's talent from the opponents, and her bowling would be a surprise element in the semifinals.

Kowsi is selected in the playing eleven during the semifinal match against the strongest team, Australia. On that day, Murugesan's house is taken away from the bank manager for not repaying the debt. Kowsi hears this and feels bad that she is not with her father. However, Kowsi is motivated by Nelson to make her father proud by playing well in the semifinals. During the match, Kowsi bowls a hat trick and also hits a six while batting, resulting in a tie. During super over, Kowsi again bowls well, leading to India's win. Kowsi is appreciated for her bowling efforts and is awarded Rs. 5 lakhs for "Woman of the Match" award. Receiving the award, Kowsi gives an emotional speech describing the situation of her father and other farmers in the country. Murugesan feels very proud of seeing Kowsi. In the closing credits, it is shown that Indian women won the T20 final against West Indies women and Kowsi was appreciated by the Tamil Nadu Government for her superb bowling tactics.

Cast 

 Sathyaraj as Murugesan
 Aishwarya Rajesh as Kousalya Murugesan 
 Sivakarthikeyan as Nelson Dilipkumar
 Darshan as Murali Krishna
 Rama as Savithri, Kousalya's mother
 Ilavarasu as Thangarasu
 Ramdoss as Inspector Patchamuthu
 Kali Prasad Mukherjee as Patel
 Namo Narayana as Politician
 Balaji Venugopal as Bank Manager
 Blade Shankar as School P. E. T. Master
 Keerthika as Young Kousalya
 Baby Monika as Young Kousalya
 Hello Kandasamy as Kandasamy
 Seenu Vasan as Old Bank Manager
 Sethupathy as Loan Officer
 Savari Muthu as Sachin
 Antony Bhagyaraj as Tendulkar
 Ashok Kumar as Anand
 Guna as Peter
 Sathya NJ as Sathya
 Aruvi Balaji as Nambi
 Pradeep Durairaj as Sekar
 Sivamaaran as Prakash
 Fathima Samreen 
 Natasha Parashar as Natasha Parashar
 Nirali Oza as Gayathri Dixit
 Shyla Alam as Anjali Sharma
 Sushree Pradhan as Deepika Patel
 Ramya Justin as Ramya
 Sajana Sajeevan as Sajana

Production 

This project was officially launched in February 2018, and actor Sivakarthikeyan is making his debut as the producer of the venture, under his newly established SK Productions banner, with actors Aishwarya Rajesh and Sathyaraj joining the cast, and debut actor Darshan was signed to play the male lead role. Dhibu Ninan Thomas, who earlier composed for Maragadha Naanayam was selected as the music director. Meanwhile, Dinesh Krishnan, Ruben, and Lalgudi N Ilayaraja was signed as a cinematographer, editor and art director for this film.This film is shot in Tiruchirapalli(Trichy, lalgudi,kulithalai),etc.

It was announced that the film would be released on December 21.

Soundtrack 

The film's soundtrack is composed by Dhibu Ninan Thomas, who happens to be classmates with Sivakarthikeyan and Arunraja Kamaraj on their college days. The album features five songs, of which the song "Vaayadi Petha Pulla" is sung by Sivakarthikeyan and his daughter Aaradhana, alongside Vaikom Vijayalakshmi as well. The audio rights of the film are secured by Sony Music India.

Release & Reception 
The movie has finally released on December 21, 2018 to highly positive reviews. M Suganth from Times of India calls the movie a "crowd-pleasing sports movie that also doubles up as a message movie on farmers and their issues", giving the film a 3.5/5 rating. The film was also dubbed and released in Hindi as Not Out on YouTube by Goldmines Telefilms in 2021.

Remake 
This film was remade in Telugu as Kousalya Krishnamurthy with Aishwarya Rajesh and Sivakarthikeyan reprising their roles from the original and Rajendra Prasad playing Sathyaraj's role.

Awards and nominations

References

External links 
 

2010s Tamil-language films
2018 films
Films set in Tamil Nadu
Indian sports drama films
2010s sports drama films
Films about cricket in India
Films about social issues in India
Films about women in India
Films about women's sports
Films shot in Tamil Nadu
Films set in Karnataka
Indian feminist films
2010s coming-of-age films
Indian nonlinear narrative films
Fictional portrayals of the Tamil Nadu Police
Tamil films remade in other languages
2018 directorial debut films
2018 drama films